Leptuca helleri, commonly known as Heller's fiddler crab, is a species of fiddler crab endemic to the Galapagos Islands in the eastern Pacific Ocean.

Taxonomy

Previously a member of the genus Uca, the species was transferred in 2016 to the genus Leptuca when Leptuca was promoted from subgenus to genus level.

Description
The carapace can be up to 12mm wide in the largest male individuals.

References

Ocypodoidea
Crustaceans described in 1902